Yassine Djakrir (born 6 December 1973) is an Algerian wrestler. He competed in the men's Greco-Roman 63 kg at the 2000 Summer Olympics.

References

External links
 

1973 births
Living people
Algerian male sport wrestlers
Olympic wrestlers of Algeria
Wrestlers at the 2000 Summer Olympics
Place of birth missing (living people)
21st-century Algerian people